Tuori is a frazione of Civitella in Val di Chiana in the province of Arezzo, Tuscany, Italy.

Town is situated hilltop overlooking the northern part of Val di Chiana.

In the past, Tuori has been a military district of Arezzo. Remains of the old fortified castle (Cassero), built in the 14th century, are still present in the town center.

The church, built in the 13th century, is devoted to Saints Giorgio and Luca.

Frazioni of the Province of Arezzo